Rubrobacter aplysinae is a Gram-positive and non-spore-forming  bacterium from the genus of Rubrobacter which has been isolated from the sponge Aplysina aerophoba from Rovinj in Croatia.

References

External links
Type strain of Rubrobacter aplysinae at BacDive –  the Bacterial Diversity Metadatabase
 

Rubrobacterales
Bacteria described in 2014